Kiteley is a surname. Notable people with the surname include:

Brian Kiteley (born 1956), American novelist and writing teacher
James Archibald Kiteley (1886–1965), Canadian physician and politician